West Bromwich Albion Reserves and Academy are the youth teams of West Bromwich Albion. The reserve team is made up of under-23 players, and is effectively West Bromwich Albion's second-string side. The under-18 players among other younger age groups make up the academy team. They play in the Premier League 2 Division 2, the second tier of reserve team football in England.

Academy staff and hierarchy

History
In the 1882–83 season, Albion fielded a reserve side for the first time; the club's second team played 24 matches and went through the season undefeated. Due to the club's financial situation, the reserves had their wages halved early in the 1885–86 season, and by January 1886 the payments made to reserve players were withdrawn altogether. This resulted in Albion's second team refusing to play against Small Heath Alliance and the game was cancelled. Some of the players were suspended as a result of their actions, but were later re-instated. The Albion reserves first competed in The Central League in 1921 and won the competition seven times.

Albion's Youth team first entered the FA Youth Cup in 1952–53. In their first game in the competition, they defeated Brush Sports by a 10–1 scoreline. They reached the final in 1954–55 and 1968–69, losing to Manchester United and Sunderland respectively. Albion won the competition for the only time in their history in 1975–76, beating local rivals Wolverhampton Wanderers 5–0 on aggregate in the two-legged final. Albion came close to reaching the final of the competition during the 2018-19 season after an impressive cup run for the first time in 43 years, only to lose to Manchester City 4-2 in the semi-final under youth coach Mike Scott. Albion would have another successful cup run in 2020-21 season only to lose to Aston Villa in the semi-final 4-1. Albion won the U23s Premier League Cup for the first time in their history under Richard Beale during the 2021-22 season beating local rivals Wolverhampton Wanderers in a penalty shootout 5-4.    Since April 2013, the club's academy has been based in the former Tom Silk Building in Halfords Lane, close to The Hawthorns.

Academy squads

Under-23 squad

Out on loan

Under-18 squad

References

External links
 West Bromwich Albion Under-23s at wba.co.uk
 West Bromwich Albion Under-18s at wba.co.uk

Reserves
Football academies in England